Four Masters is a GAA club located in the town of Donegal in County Donegal, Ireland. They are one of the strongholds of Gaelic football in Donegal.

History
Based in the parishes of Townawilly and Killymard, Donegal Town, Four Masters is one of the oldest and most successful clubs in Donegal having won 3 Donegal Senior Football Championships.

The GAA club under Warwickshire County Board in Coventry, England, is named after the Four Masters club in Donegal. That club was unable to register as a Donegal Club but reserved the Four Masters name.

Austin O'Kennedy, a top GAA doctor who oversaw all Donegal county teams for 22 years, has also been involved with Four Masters for even longer. Tom Conaghan who managed the Four Masters to two county championships in 1982 and 1984 went on to manage the county team during the late 80s. He managed Donegal to the 1989 Ulster Final which they lost in a replay to Tyrone.

The club has more All Stars Awards than any other club in the county, Donal Monaghan winning one in 1974 (the year he was Man of the Match against Down in the Ulster Senior Football Championship final), Joyce McMullan winning one in 1990, Paul Durcan winning two in 2012 and 2014 and Karl Lacey winning four in 2006 and 2009 at corner back and 2011 and 2012 at centre-half back. Lacey also won the GAA GPA Player of the year award in 2012.

After the 2012 All-Ireland Senior Football Championship Final, Four Masters organised the homecoming for the victorious Donegal county team.

Notable players

 Seamus Bonner — Ulster SFC winner: 1972, 1974, 1983
 Shane Carr — All-Ireland SFC semi-finalist: 2003
 Barry Dunnion
 Paul Durcan — All Star: 2012, 2014
 Luke Keaney
 Michael Kelly
 Karl Lacey — All Star: 2006, 2009, 2011, 2012 + 2012 All Stars Footballer of the Year
 Kevin McBrearty
 Joyce McMullan — All Star: 1990
 Barry Monaghan — All-Ireland SFC semi-finalist: 2003
 Donal Monaghan — All Star: 1974
 Paddy Reid
 Benny Cassidy- 1992-2022:- Longest Serving Player
 [[

Managers

Honours
 Donegal Senior Football Championship: 1982, 1984, 2003
 Donegal Senior Football League Division 1: 1948, 1949, 2010
 Donegal Senior Reserve Football Championship: 2000, 2001, 2010
 Donegal Senior Football League Division 1 Reserves: 2000, 2001, 2009, 2011, 2014
 Donegal Senior Football League Division 2: 1981, 1989, 1996
 Donegal Intermediate Football Championship: 1996
 Donegal Intermediate Reserve Football Championship: 1995, 1996
 Donegal Football League Shield: 1987, 1993
 Donegal Junior Football Championship: 1943, 1965, 1975
 Donegal Under-21 Football Championship: 1979, 2001
 Donegal Under-21B Football Championship: 1995
 Donegal Minor Football Championship: 1996, 2001, 2002, 2007,2022
 Donegal Minor B Football Championship: 2014

References

External links
 Official website
 GAA results - Irish Independent

1932 establishments in Ireland
Donegal (town)
Gaelic games clubs in County Donegal
Gaelic football clubs in County Donegal
Hurling clubs in County Donegal